Cascione is an Italian surname. Notable people with the surname include:

Emmanuel Cascione (born 1983), Italian footballer and coach
Steve Cascione (born 1954), American television meteorologist

Italian-language surnames